Hafize Hafsa Sultan  was an Ottoman princess, daughter of Selim I and, presumably, of his favorite Hafsa Hatun. She was therefore the sister or at least half-sister of Suleiman the Magnificent. Her firstname meaning "keeper", while her second name meaning "young lioness".

Origins 
Hafize, also called Hafsa, Hafife, Hafisa or Hafiza in the sources, was born not after 1493 in Trebizond, on the Black Sea, by the then Şehzade Selim, son of Bayezid II and governor of the province. The identity of her mother is uncertain, but most believe she is the daughter of Hafsa Hatun, Selim's favorite of Crimean origin and mother of his successor Suleiman the Magnificent. The year of her birth is unknown, but, if she really was Hafsa's daughter, she would have been born before 1492 or 1493. 

In 1512, her father became Sultan, while Hafize was already married in 1511 and lived with her husband. When her husband became Grand Vizier, she moved with him to Constantinople.

Marriage 

Hafize Sultan married twice:

 She married for the first time in 1511. Her first husband was Grand Vizier Dukaginzade Ahmed Paşa, executed in 1515.
 Her second husband, married in 1522, was  Boşnak Mustafa Paşah. From this marriage she had her only child, a son, Sultanzade Kara Osman Şah Paşah.

Death 
Hafize died on July 10, 1538, in Constantinople. She was buried next to her father in the Yavuz Selim Mosque.

References

Bibliography 
 Peirce, Leslie P., The Imperial Harem: Women and Sovereignty in the Ottoman Empire, Oxford University Press, 1993, .
 Uluçay, M. Çağatay (1992). Padişahların kadınları ve kızları. Ötüken.
 Yılmaz Öztuna - Yavuz Sultan Selim
 Necdet Sakaoğlu - Bu Mülkün Kadın Sultanları

Ottoman Empire